Össur Skarphéðinsson (pronounced ; born 19 June 1953) is an Icelandic politician who served as Minister for Foreign Affairs from February 2009 to May 2013.

Össur matriculated from the Reykjavík Grammar School in 1973, and gained a BS in biology from the University of Iceland in 1979, and a doctorate from the University of East Anglia in 1983 entitled "The effect of photoperiod on the growth of the rainbow trout". He was a member of the parliament (Althing) for the Reykjavík Constituency from 1991 to 2003, and for Reykjavík North Constituency from 2003 to 2016. He was Chairman of the Social Democratic Party parliamentary group from 1991 to 1993, Minister for the Environment from 1993 to 1995, and Chairman of the Social Democratic Alliance from 2000 to 2005.

Össur was appointed Minister of Industry, Energy and Tourism for the Social Democratic Alliance in May 2007. He was also Minister for Nordic Cooperation from 24 May 2007 to 10 June 2008. In February 2009, he was appointed Minister for Foreign Affairs.

References

External links
Personal blog
Össur's profile; from Wikileaks
 Profile of Össur Skarphéðinsson in English, European Voice, 22 April 2010

1953 births
Living people
Alumni of the University of East Anglia
Ossur Skarphedinsson
Ossur Skarphedinsson
Ossur Skarphedinsson
Ossur Skarphedinsson
Ossur Skarphedinsson
Ossur Skarphedinsson
Ossur Skarphedinsson